Kaay Ghadla Tya Ratri? is a Marathi Suspense, crime thriller television series. The series premiered on 31 December 2020, replacing Dancing Queen on Zee Marathi.

Plot 
Siddhant tells his friends that he is going to work in the upcoming movie of Kapoor films. At the event of Gopalkala, Siddhant speaks against Rajan Parvate. Kapoor's statement on the call shocks Siddhant. Siddhant worries as he has no money for his medical treatment. On Ajay's behest, Siddhant asks Sanjana for money. Sanjana agrees, but on the condition that he apologises to Rajan. While Shivani and Siddhant are partying with Ajay and Kuldeep, Siddhant gets in an argument with them. After that, Siddhant found murder. Inspector Wadkar reveals before journalists that Siddhant's death might be a murder. He interrogates Ajay and Kuldeep. Wadkar assures Pardeshi that he will solve Siddhant's case by tomorrow. Pardeshi chides Wadkar for having a press conference. Revati poses as journalist and interacts with Shivani as Sanjana and later, reveals true identity to Wadkar. A question asked by Revati leaves Sanjana stunned and Dhanraj tells Revati that he won't take Siddhant's body until justice is served. The journalists question about Siddhant enrage Chaya. Dhanraj, Ajay and Kuldeep makes allegations against Karina and search her house. Revati asks to handle the case with Wadkar. Dhavale tells Revati that Karina and her mother have fled. Then, Sanjana makes a plan with Karina and her mother against Revati that Revati forced Karina to accept that she murdered Siddhant Chhaya that night.

Cast

Main
 Manasi Salvi as IPS Revati Borkar
 Gaurav Ghatnekar as Siddhant Dhanraj Bhalekar (Sid)

Recurring
 Smita Gondkar as Sanjana Raghav (Actress)
 Sushant Shelar as Ajay Deshmukh (Actor)
 Chetan Vadnere as Kuldeep More (Sid's friend)
 Jaywant Wadkar as Ramakant Dhavale (Sub-inspector)
 Kishor Kadam as Rajan Parvate (Politician)
 Vijay Nikam as Dhanraj Bhalekar (Sid's father)
 Rekha Bade as Chhaya Dhanraj Bhalekar (Sid's mother)
 Kajal Patil as Karina (Sid's maid)
 Sunny Bhushan as Dattatray Navangule (Dattu)
 Swapnil Dinkar as Rohan Nare; Ladha Vrutta channel’s news reporter
 Swati Limaye as Shivani Desai; Lokgarjana channel's news reporter
 Dnayesh Wadekar as Shailesh Wadkar (Inspector)
 Shivraj Walvekar as Avinash Pardeshi (Police Commissioner)
 Apurva Choudhari as Laxmi (Lady Inspector)
 Sanjay Jadhav as Vishwajeet Chandra; Revati's husband (Advocate)
 Vandana Marathe as Chiu's caretaker
 Sakshi Paranjape as Minakshi Parvate (Rajan's wife)
 Aabha Velenkar as Karina's mother
 Shubham Sapre as Police Constable
 Mahesh Kulkarni as Divakar; Chhaya's brother

References

External links 
 Kaay Ghadla Tya Ratri? at ZEE5
 

Marathi-language television shows
Indian crime television series
2020 Indian television series debuts
Zee Marathi original programming
2021 Indian television series endings